Pseudometric may refer to:

 The metric of a pseudo-Riemannian manifold, a non-degenerate, smooth, symmetric tensor field of arbitrary signature
 Pseudometric space, a generalization of a metric that does not necessarily distinguish points (and so typically used to study certain non-Hausdorff spaces)